Brockton Brightfield in Brockton, Massachusetts is a solar power plant in New England. Consisting of 1,395 photovoltaic panels on a  site, it has a maximum output of 425 kilowatts. It was officially opened on October 26, 2006, on the site of the former Brockton Gas Works.

When built, the site was said to be the largest "brightfield" in the U.S., although other developments since then are larger.  "Brightfield" is a term for an abandoned industrial site that has been turned into a solar-power facility. It is a blend of the words "bright" and "brownfield", the latter referring to abandoned, often polluted, industrial sites that have been redeveloped.

It was the largest photovoltaic site in New England for several years, but was surpassed by several utility-owned sites in 2010.

References

External links

 EPA's Potential Advantages of Reusing Potentially Contaminated Land for Renewable Energy Fact Sheet (PDF)

Buildings and structures in Brockton, Massachusetts
Photovoltaic power stations in the United States